The women's 1000 meter at the 2015 KNSB Dutch Single Distance Championships took place in Heerenveen at the Thialf ice skating rink on Sunday 2 November 2014. Although this tournament was held in 2014, it was part of the speed skating season 2014–2015. 
There were 24 participants.

Title holder was Marrit Leenstra.

Result

Source:

References 

Single Distance Championships
2015 Single Distance
World